"If You've Got Love" is a song written by Mark D. Sanders and Steve Seskin, and recorded by American country music artist John Michael Montgomery.  It was released in September 1994 as the fourth and final single from his album Kickin' It Up.  It peaked at number 1 on the week of December 10, 1994, while it peaked at number 2 in Canada.

Chart positions

Year-end charts

References

[  Allmusic]

1994 singles
1994 songs
John Michael Montgomery songs
Songs written by Steve Seskin
Songs written by Mark D. Sanders
Song recordings produced by Scott Hendricks
Atlantic Records singles